Moritz Baerwald (3 December 1860 – 26 December 1919) was  a German lawyer and politician of the German Democratic Party, a member of the Prussian House of Representatives and the Weimar National Assembly.

Baerwald was born in Thorn, West Prussia (Toruń, Poland), where he grew up and passed his Abitur. He studied law at the Universities of Heidelberg, Leipzig and  Berlin and started to practise as a lawyer in Bromberg (Bydgoszcz, Poland) in 1887 (notary since 1908).

Baerwald  became an active member of the Jewish community of Bromberg and, in 1902, a member of the executive board of the Chamber of Advocates of Posen (Poznań, Poland). In 1903 Baerwald was elected a member of the town council of Bromberg and represented the constituency of  Bromberg 5 (Mogilno – Wongrowitz – Znin) in the Prussian House of Representatives from 1912 to 1918.  Following World War I he became a  member of the Weimar National Assembly, where he vehemently opposed the incorporation of the Province of Posen into the Second Polish Republic.

Baerwald died in December 1919, within the legislative session, in Berlin and was buried at the Weißensee cemetery.

References

1860 births
1919 deaths
People from Toruń
People from West Prussia
Heidelberg University alumni
Leipzig University alumni
Humboldt University of Berlin alumni
Jewish German politicians
German Democratic Party politicians
Members of the Prussian House of Representatives
Members of the Weimar National Assembly